Nicholas Flanagan (born 13 June 1984) is an Australian professional golfer.

Flanagan was born in Belmont, New South Wales. He won the 2003 U.S. Amateur, the first non-American winner since 1971. He was awarded the 2003 Australian Young Male Athlete of the Year. He turned professional in 2004.

Flanagan currently plays on the Nationwide Tour. He achieved his first professional win at the 2005 Queensland Masters, which is part of the PGA Tour of Australasia's developmental series known as the Von Nida Tour.

In 2007, Flanagan won back-to-back starts on the Nationwide Tour, the Henrico County Open and the BMW Charity Pro-Am at The Cliffs. A third win later that year at the Xerox Classic, gave Flanagan an automatic "battlefield promotion" to the PGA Tour. Flanagan recorded two top 20 finishes in his first two starts on the PGA Tour as an official member. He finished tied for 18th and tied for 17th in two Fall Series events. He was voted the 2007 Nationwide Tour Player of the Year. Flanagan's first full year on the PGA Tour was in 2008, where he finished 169th. His finish was not good enough to retain his tour card and he returned to the Nationwide Tour for 2009.

Amateur wins
2002 R/UP Australian Junior Championship
2003 U.S. Amateur, Under-19 New Zealand Championship, Pacific Northwest Amateur

Professional wins (7)

Web.com Tour wins (4)

Web.com Tour playoff record (2–0)

Von Nida Tour wins (1)

Other wins (2)
2003 Tasmanian Open (as an amateur)
2022 Cathedral Invitational

Results in major championships

CUT = missed the half-way cut
"T" = tied

Team appearances
Amateur
Nomura Cup (representing Australia): 2003 (winners)
Bonallack Trophy (representing Asia/Pacific): 2004 (winners)
Australian Men's Interstate Teams Matches (representing New South Wales): 2003

See also
2007 Nationwide Tour graduates
List of golfers with most Web.com Tour wins

External links

Nick Flanagan at the Skillest official site

Australian male golfers
PGA Tour of Australasia golfers
PGA Tour golfers
Korn Ferry Tour graduates
Sportspeople from Newcastle, New South Wales
1984 births
Living people